Phaeotomasellia is a genus of fungi in the class Dothideomycetes. The relationship of this taxon to other taxa within the class is unknown (incertae sedis). A monotypic genus, it contains the single species Phaeotomasellia ruwenzorensis.

See also 
 List of Dothideomycetes genera incertae sedis

References

External links 
 Index Fungorum

Dothideomycetes enigmatic taxa
Monotypic Dothideomycetes genera